Vivien Judith Rose, Lady Rose of Colmworth,  (born 13 April 1960) is a senior British judge, currently sitting as a Justice of the Supreme Court of the United Kingdom.

Education
Rose was born in London in 1960. She took her first degree at Newnham College, Cambridge and a post-graduate degree at Brasenose College, Oxford.

Career
Rose was called to the bar at Gray's Inn in 1984. In 1992, she was appointed standing counsel to the Director General of Fair Trading. In 2005, she was made a Legal Chairman of the Competition Appeal Tribunal. She was approved to sit as a deputy High Court judge.

On 13 May 2013, she was appointed a High Court judge, assigned to the Chancery Division, and received the customary appointment as a Dame Commander of the Order of the British Empire (DBE). She was President of the Tax and Chancery Chamber of the Upper Tribunal.
In 2019, she was appointed to the Court of Appeal, receiving the customary appointment to the Privy Council of the United Kingdom. 

On 4 March 2021, it was announced that she would replace Lady Black of Derwent as a Justice of the Supreme Court of the United Kingdom. The Queen made the appointment on the advice of the Prime Minister and Lord Chancellor, following the recommendations of an independent selection commission. She assumed her new office on 19 April 2021, taking the judicial courtesy title of Lady Rose of Colmworth.

Notable decisions
Notable judicial decisions of Lady Rose include:
  in relation to breach of the Quincecare duty (upheld by the Court of Appeal on other grounds).

References

Links
 The Union of Choice for Senior Managers and Professionals in Public Service: Dame Vivien Rose, recent appointee to the High Court Chancery Division and former chair of the Competition Appeal Tribunal; accessed 22 March 2014.
 About the Judiciary; accessed 22 March 2014.
 Vivien Rose profile; accessed 22 March 2014.

1960 births
Living people
21st-century English judges
Chancery Division judges
Dames Commander of the Order of the British Empire
Lady Justices of Appeal
Members of the Privy Council of the United Kingdom
Members of Gray's Inn
21st-century women judges